Gültan Kışanak (born 15 June 1961) is a Kurdish journalist, author and politician from Turkey. Kışanak was born in Elazığ in 1961. Her family is originally from Dersim.  She is a former member of the Grand National Assembly of Turkey and Mayor of Diyarbakır. She has been imprisoned since October 2016.

Education 
She began studying at the Faculty of Education of Dicle University in 1978 but was arrested in 1980 and was imprisoned in the Diyarbakir Prison for two years. According to her own account, she had to stay in the dog kennel of the prison warden for two months because she refused to stand up in his presence. In another speech, she said that she slept in a dog hut for six months. She began studying journalism at Ege University, Izmir, in 1986. On the 16 March 1988 she was arrested while protesting Saddam Hussein's attack on Halabja. She was released one year later. After her release, she graduated in 1990.

Journalistic career 
From 1990 to 1992 she wrote for the newspaper Yeni Ülke. Afterwards she worked as an editor in chief, an editorial coordinator or news director in a variety of newspapers from 1990 to 2004. For the pro-Kurdish Özgür Gündem, she reported from Adana and after she moved to Istanbul, she became its editor in chief for a while. Following the closure of Özgür Gündem in 1994, she wrote for Özgür Ülke which was shut down on 2 February 1995 on grounds that it represented a continuation of Özgür Gündem.

Political career 
In 2004, she became a social policy consultant in the Baĝlar Municipality in Diyarbakir and has been involved in the Kardelen Women’s House in Diyarbakır. She stood successfully as an independent candidate within the Democratic Society Party (DTP) supported Thousand Hopes alliance in the 2007 parliamentary election in Turkey and became an MP for Diyarbakır. During the campaign she was quoted as saying, "This election is important because Turkey is at a crossroads. Either it is going to opt for developing democratic alternatives or will bring the oppressive policies back on to the agenda. We are hoping for the democratic forces to come out of these elections much stronger and help to establish the options of democracy dialog and peace. We'll search for solutions not in violence, but in parliament."

In the beginning of 2009 it was reported that she had prepared a bill to enable the Kurdish language to be used in the public space. For the Parliamentary Elections in 2011 she was elected as an independent candidate from southeastern Siirt province.

In the Municipal elections in March 2014, she was elected as a first female Mayor of Diyarbakır. In view of the detentions of several mayors from the Democratic Regions Party (DBP) over self government claims, she defended them alleging self governance is a political aim and also demanded self governance. On 25 October 2016 she was detained together with co-mayor Fırat Anlı which resulted in almost hundred feminist and LGTB rights organizations to demand her release.

Legal prosecution and imprisonment 
According to her own account Kisanak was imprisoned for 4 1/2 years before she was arrested again. Her renewed detention in October 2015 was on  "charges of being a member of the Kurdistan Workers Party (PKK)". Following the two Co-Mayors arrest, the Turkish government ordered a general internet blackout. Nevertheless, on 26 October, several thousand demonstrators at Diyarbakir city hall demanded the mayors’ release. In November, public prosecutors demanded a 230-year prison sentence for Kışanak. In February 2019 she was sentenced to 14 years and 3 months in prison for "being a member of a terrorist organization" and for "propaganda of a terrorist organization". In prison, she wrote the book The Color Purple of Kurdish Politics about women in politics. She is detained in the F-Type prison in Kandira, Kocaeli.

Personal life 
She grew up in a household of an Alevi faith is married and has a daughter.

Movies 
She was featured in the 2008 film “What a beautiful democracy” about the struggle of Turkish women running for parliament.

She was also interviewed for the movie Hevî of Yüksel Yavuz.

References

1961 births
People from Elazığ
Living people
Turkish journalists
Turkish women journalists
Women mayors of places in Turkey
Mayors of places in Turkey
Turkish Kurdish politicians
Deputies of Siirt
Democratic Regions Party politicians
Deputies of Diyarbakır
Members of the 24th Parliament of Turkey
Members of the 23rd Parliament of Turkey
Mayors of Diyarbakır
People expelled from public office
Turkish prisoners and detainees
Politicians arrested in Turkey
21st-century Turkish women politicians
21st-century Turkish politicians
21st-century Kurdish women politicians
Kurdish writers
Kurdish women writers
Kurdish Alevis
Kurdish journalists
Kurdish women journalists